The  was an infantry division of the Imperial Japanese Army. Its call sign was the .It was formed on 10 July 1940 at Kanazawa, simultaneously with 51st, 54th, 55th, 56th, and 57th divisions. The formation nucleus was the headquarters of the 9th division. The men for the 52nd division were recruited from Ishikawa, Toyama and Nagano prefectures. 

The 52nd division was the provisional unit, intended to form sub-units usable by other military units, rather than being used itself. In particular, 16th mountain artillery regiment and 52nd cavalry regiment were detached in October 1943. The division was renamed Kanazawa mobilization district in 1941 (not to be mistaken with the Kanazawa mobilization district command formed in 1945). 

In January 1944, the 52nd division was reformed as marine division, absorbing artillery and engineer units into infantry regiments, and sent to Chuuk Lagoon, to be incorporated into the 31st army formed 18 February 1944. As Allies have bypassed the Japanese supply center of Chuuk Lagoon (Truk), the 52nd division had not seen much action or hardship besides being occasionally bombed during Operation Hailstone.

See also
 List of Japanese Infantry Divisions

Notes
This article incorporates material from Japanese Wikipedia page 第52師団 (日本軍), accessed 2 June 2016

See also
 List of Japanese Infantry Divisions

Reference and further reading

Japanese World War II divisions
Infantry divisions of Japan
Military units and formations established in 1940
Military units and formations disestablished in 1945
1940 establishments in Japan
1945 disestablishments in Japan